The Asian barbets are a family of bird species, the Megalaimidae, comprising two genera with 34 species native to the forests of the Indomalayan realm from Tibet to Indonesia. They were once clubbed with all barbets in the family Capitonidae but the Old World species have been found to be distinctive and are considered, along with the Lybiidae and Ramphastidae, as sister groups.
In the past the species were placed in three genera, Caloramphus, Megalaima and Psilopogon, but studies show that Psilopogon to be nested within the clade of Megalaima. Since members of this clade are better treated under a single genus, they have been moved to the genus Psilopogon which was described and erected earlier than Megalaima and is therefore chosen on the basis of taxonomic priority principles. Nearly all members of the family are now in the genus Psilopogon, with the exception of those in Caloramphus, which are thought to have genetically diverged from the common ancestor around 21.32 million years ago. The latter species are distinct enough to warrant placement in a subfamily Caloramphinae.

Classification

Subfamily Megalaiminae
 Genus Psilopogon
 Psilopogon annamensis, Indochinese barbet
 Psilopogon armillaris, Flame-fronted barbet
 Psilopogon asiaticus, Blue-throated barbet
 Psilopogon auricularis, Necklaced barbet
 Psilopogon australis,  Yellow-eared barbet
 Psilopogon chersonesus, Turquoise-throated barbet
 Psilopogon chrysopogon, Golden-whiskered barbet
 Psilopogon corvinus, Brown-throated barbet
 Psilopogon cyanotis,  Blue-eared barbet
 Psilopogon duvaucelii, Black-eared barbet
 Psilopogon eximius, Bornean barbet
 Psilopogon faber, Chinese barbet
 Psilopogon faiostrictus, Green-eared barbet
 Psilopogon flavifrons, Yellow-fronted barbet
 Psilopogon franklinii, Golden-throated barbet
 Psilopogon haemacephalus, Coppersmith barbet
 Psilopogon henricii, Yellow-crowned barbet
 Psilopogon incognitus, Moustached barbet
 Psilopogon javensis, Black-banded barbet
 Psilopogon lagrandieri, Red-vented barbet
 Psilopogon lineatus, Lineated barbet
 Psilopogon malabaricus,  Malabar barbet
 Psilopogon monticola, Mountain barbet
 Psilopogon mystacophanos, Red-throated barbet
 Psilopogon nuchalis, Taiwan barbet
 Psilopogon oorti, Black-browed barbet
 Psilopogon pulcherrima, Golden-naped barbet
 Psilopogon pyrolophus, Fire-tufted barbet
 Psilopogon rafflesii, Red-crowned barbet
 Psilopogon rubricapillus, Crimson-fronted barbet
 Psilopogon virens, Great barbet
 Psilopogon viridis, White-cheeked barbet
 Psilopogon zeylanicus, Brown-headed barbet

Subfamily Caloramphinae
 Genus Caloramphus
 Caloramphus fuliginosus, Brown barbet
 Caloramphus hayii, Sooty barbet

References

 
Extant Pleistocene first appearances
Bird families
Taxa named by Edward Blyth